Niti Intharapichai (born 24 August 1976) is a Thai swimmer. He competed in two events at the 1996 Summer Olympics.

References

1976 births
Living people
Niti Intharapichai
Niti Intharapichai
Swimmers at the 1996 Summer Olympics
Place of birth missing (living people)